Aethalida hollowayi is a moth of the family Erebidae. It was described by Vladimir Viktorovitch Dubatolov and Yasunori Kishida in 2005. It is found on Sulawesi.

References

Moths described in 2005
Spilosomina
Moths of Indonesia